The 1966 Rutgers Scarlet Knights football team represented Rutgers University in the 1966 NCAA University Division football season. In their seventh season under head coach John F. Bateman, the Scarlet Knights compiled a 5–4 record, won the Middle Three Conference championship, and outscored their opponents 184 to 177. The team's statistical leaders included Fred Eckert with 756 passing yards, Bryant Mitchell with 540 rushing yards, and Jack Emmer with 701 receiving yards. Co-captain, senior Bob Schroeder, was a rarity as the Scarlet Knights' "ironman" starting on offense as the team's center and on defense as a linebacker earning All-East recognition. Schroeder also handled the team's long snapping duties. 

The Scarlet Knights played their home games at Rutgers Stadium in Piscataway, New Jersey, across the river from the university's main campus in New Brunswick.

Schedule

References

Rutgers
Rutgers Scarlet Knights football seasons
Rutgers Scarlet Knights football